Wehling is a surname. Notable people with the surname include:

Heinz-Helmut Wehling (born 1950), German wrestler
Ulrich Wehling (born 1952), German skier